The episodes for the ninth season of the anime series Naruto: Shippuden are based on Part II for Masashi Kishimoto's manga series. The anime only season aired from September 2010 to January 2011, and contains past flashback episodes for Naruto Uzumaki and his friends.

The English dub of the season aired on Neon Alley from March 30 to July 6, 2013. The season would make its English television debut on Adult Swim's Toonami programming block and premiere from October 8, 2017 to March 25, 2018.

The season contains five musical themes: two openings and three endings. The first opening theme,  by Motohiro Hata is used from episodes 176 to 179. The second opening theme song, "Diver" by Nico Touches the Walls is used from episodes 180 to 196. The first ending theme,  by Supercell is used from episodes 176 to 179. The second ending theme,"U Can Do It!" by DOMINO is used from episodes 180 to 192. The third ending theme,  by Aqua Timez is used from episodes 193 to 196.


Episode list

Home releases

Japanese

English

References

General
 

2010 Japanese television seasons
2011 Japanese television seasons
Shippuden Season 09

Specific